"Pitiful" is the fourth single released from Sick Puppies' 2007 album Dressed Up as Life. This song talks about how useless someone thinks their life is, to the point where they feel like killing themselves. The person has been looking for a reason to not end it all, but has not found one by the end of the song. The subject of the song has abused all the drugs he knows of, with the only exceptions being heroin and cyanide because he "can't afford them yet".

Music video
The band released a live presentation as the official video for the single.

Track listing

References

2008 singles
Sick Puppies songs
2007 songs
Virgin Records singles
Songs written by Shimon Moore
Song recordings produced by Rock Mafia
Songs written by Tim James (musician)
Songs written by Antonina Armato
Songs written by Emma Anzai